Kylie and Garibay (stylized as Kylie + Garibay; alternatively titled Black and White on Minogue's website) is the eponymous second extended play (EP) by musical duo Kylie and Garibay. It was released on 11 September 2015 by Parlophone and Warner Bros. Records and served as a sequel to Kylie and Garibay's first collaboration, Sleepwalker (2014). Produced by American producer Fernando Garibay and Italian disc jockey (DJ) Giorgio Moroder, the three-track EP was developed between February and August 2015, shortly after Kylie Minogue's departure from Parlophone and American-based management Roc Nation. Musically, it is influenced by electronica, ambient house, and, after Minogue's departure, reggae and dancehall. Its lyrical content completes a story arc that began in their previous EP, going from loss to recovery.

Released with no prior announcement, Kylie and Garibay received positive reviews from most music critics. The majority of the reviews highlighted Minogue's return to mainstream dance music and complimented the production by Garibay and Moroder. The EP's lead track, "Black and White", received an accompanying music video directed by long-time friend and collaborator Katerina Jebb. Even though it was intended as a low-key underground project, the EP garnered acclaim in countries including Australia, France, Spain, and the United Kingdom. As a surprise, the singer appeared at Moroder's Los Angeles gig to play and sing along to their track, "Your Body".

Background and development

In January 2015, Italian DJ Giorgio Moroder confirmed a new musical project with Minogue and Garibay, revealing to American website Idolator that "She is doing another EP with [their] friend Fernando who did most of Lady Gaga's Born This Way." He described the approach as "very sexy and uncommercial".

A year after Kiss Me Once'''s release, Minogue's contract with Parlophone ended. Alongside this, she announced her departure from Roc Nation and planned "to take more control over her career". Minogue began negotiations with a number of major labels, ultimately signing to BMG Rights Management in December 2016. She licensed other projects from her own production company to previous label Parlophone Records and Warner Bros. Records in the interim period. In an interview with Billboard, Minogue commented about her working with Garibay: "It was a beautiful thing, because [they] did it in [their] own time [...] Whenever [she] was in L.A., [she] would drop by [Garibay's] home studio—which is a lovely place to be anyway—and really there was no pressure. It was just about expression and kind of mashing things up." Jamaican artist Shaggy was first suggested by Garibay's manager Martin Kierszenbaum, who felt Shaggy and Minogue would be a workable duet as they had known each other prior to this project.

CompositionKylie and Garibay was developed and recorded between February and August 2015. Originally, Minogue wanted to feature four recordings, but she narrowed it down to three for unknown reasons. Each track featured guest vocalists—"Black and White" featured vocals during the bridge and ending section by Shaggy; "If I Can't Have You" included vocals by Australian singer Sam Sparro; and the final track, "Your Body", included vocals and production by Giorgio Moroder. Apart from the second track, "Black and White" and "Your Body" were co-written and co-composed by Minogue. Likewise, Garibay produced the entire project with the help of Moroder on the latter song. Musically, Kylie and Garibay was influenced by electronic music whilst its lyrical content delved into love, enjoyment, and sex.

According to Bradley Stern from MuuMuse, "The 3-track set is another forward-thinking, shape-shifting offering, each with a different feature and feel." Stern described "Black and White" as a "beautiful and bizarre pop hybrid" and noted that it "set the tone" of the EP. With this statement, he compared the composition to that of American DJ and producer Kaskade. Mike Wass from Idolator commented that "the tone is very different this time", labeling it more "accessible" compared to Minogue and Garibay's "experimental" elements on tracks "Walk" and "Chasing Ghosts". Robbie Daw from Idolator found that the sound was reminiscent of Minogue's previous work. Lewis Corner from Digital Spy labeled the sound as "warm". Lyrically, the song delved into a broken relationship, where Minogue explained her sadness of looking at photographs of an ex-boyfriend. The next track, "If I Can't Have You", was a house composition that incorporated elements of tropical music. Sparro's vocals were "breathy falsetto" in comparison to his previous work. The final track, "Your Body", was noted by critics for Moroder's Italian introduction; Moroder stated that Minogue asked him if he "could do a little talk in Italian on her music. She wanted it really sexy, like a Latin lover – heavy breathing." Christina Lee from Idolator, who reviewed a live performance of the song, said it was "just as the electronic music trailblazer described: sexy, seductive and more ambient". Zoe Camp from Pitchfork Media compared the track's sound to the work of Swedish musician Robyn.

Release and promotion
Despite Minogue's contractual end with Parlophone Records in March 2015, Kylie and Garibay was licensed by Minogue's own production company on 11 September 2015 by the Parlophone label, alongside Warner Bros. Records, with no prior announcement. It was distributed on the iTunes Store and Spotify by Parlophone, featuring the three tracks. On her website, Minogue commented that she is "so happy to finally be able to share these songs with fans. And to have each track featuring such amazing and different artists – Shaggy, Giorgio Moroder and Sam Sparro – is a real thrill. Fernando really lives and breathes for music, and [they] had a lot of fun plotting to surprise fans with these songs." The EP and a separate project called Kylie Christmas (also released in 2015) were the final projects that Minogue worked on with Parlophone and Warner Bros. Records to date, albeit with both releases remaining under Minogue's ownership and licensed to her old labels, which she still considered "family".

Prior to the EP's release, Minogue, Garibay, and Moroder appeared at a musical gig in Los Angeles, California in February 2015. Moroder was the headlining act, and they collectively performed a live version of "Your Body". Subsequently, Minogue released the music video to "Black and White" on YouTube; it was directed by English artist and Minogue's long-term friend, Katerina Jebb, in order to promote the EP. The visuals were inspired by old film footage; the singer wanted to place herself in a vintage-oriented set-up. To achieve this, video editor Benjamin Ricart created "old grainy" and "damaged" overlaps. Noted by critics for its stripped-down appeal and a lack of "polished" looks, the video was compared to the visual work of American musician Lana Del Rey, whom was also noted for her use of vintage footage and editing.

ReceptionKylie and Garibay received positive reviews from most music critics. Bradley Stern from MuuMuse praised the EP's "mid-transition". Stern further noted musical and production similarities between the EP and Minogue's 1997 album Impossible Princess; he concluded "As it turns out, IndieKylie is alive and well. This is a very good thing." Zoe Camp from Pitchfork Media highlighted "Your Body" as the EP's best entry, complimented Moroder's vocal inclusion, and commended the track's 1980s music influences. Billboard editor Keith Caulfield wrote, "When a megastar like Kylie Minogue drops new music out of the sky without warning, it’s a pop emergency of the best kind." He reflected on the EP's release, commending the production and inclusions of Shaggy, Giorgio Moroder, and Minogue's vocals.

As a low-key, experimental project, Kylie and Garibay'' was not expected to be commercially successful. However, the EP and its three songs appeared on iTunes charts in countries including the United Kingdom, Australia, France, and Spain.

Track listing
All three tracks were produced by Fernando Garibay and Giorgio Moroder.

Personnel
The following credits are adapted from the Australasian Performing Right Association (APRA).

 Kylie Minogue – lead vocals, background vocals
 Fernando Garibay – production
 Giorgio Moroder – production

Release history

References

External links
Kylie and Garibay at Minogue's official website

2015 EPs
Albums produced by Fernando Garibay
Albums produced by Giorgio Moroder
Kylie and Garibay albums
Parlophone EPs
Warner Records EPs